Dark Dice is a Dungeons & Dragons themed podcast, produced by Fool & Scholar Productions, written and created by the husband and wife duo Kaitlin Statz and Travis Vengroff. The story of the podcast is divided in chapters, where 16 chapters and 28 episodes have been aired so far in its completed first season and recently started second season, as of June 2021. The new episodes of the podcast are usually released on monthly basis and are fan-funded. The podcast has been developed based on the 5th edition rules of Dungeons and Dragons. The voice over of all the main five characters are created with actual voice over instead of NCR and immersive soundscapes have been used in combination with ambience and music. From the second season onwards Jeff Goldblum joined the podcast to play the role of the character Balmur in the podcast.

Plot 

The first season of the podcast revolves around the story of rescuing the missing children of Ilmater's Hope. Accordingly, the team follows the trail deep into the Dead Pines where they unfortunately attract the attention of The Silent One, a sinister creature that has the ability to steal the face and voice of whoever it pleases. The Silent One kills and replaces members of the team and in such a way it is now controlled by the deceased player and thus getting one step closer to its terrible goal.

The second season starts in the tail of the First season's story, where the two teams start fighting against each other in order to attain revenge, after a failed attempt to save the world. In this season also, The Silent One stalks the team members in order to get its aim materialized.

Episodes

Cast

Season One: Story 1: Domain of the Nameless God 

 Narrator / Game Master – Travis Vengroff
 Iaus Innskeep – David Ault
 Sister Tsavorite Cavernsfall– Kaitlin Statz
 Soren Arkwright – Peter Lewis
 Father Sindri Westpike – Eyþór Viðarsson
 Flygia of Zarketh – Kessi Riliniki
 Rowena Granitepike – Hem Cleveland
 Coal – Eric Nelsen

Season Two – The Long Road 

 Narrator / Game Master – Travis Vengroff
 Balmur – Jeff Goldblum
 Soren Arkwright – Peter Joseph Lewis
 Ildrex Mystan – Russ More
 Glom of House Vogelberg – Sean Howard
 Gaelle of House Vogelberg – Holly Billinghurst
 Rowena Granitepike – Hem Cleveland
 Father Sindri Westpike – Eyþór Viðarsson
 Helrintheenath - Ronald Hamrák

Awards and honors

Reception 
The Syfy Wire commented on the podcast that "the show edits out the pauses that naturally come while playing D&D, re-records NPC voices with trained voice actors, and scores the whole thing with Foley work, an orchestra featuring more than 30 medieval instruments, and a live 40-person choir singing in Icelandic, Elvish, and more."

References

External links 
 
 Dark Dice Podcast Official Website

2018 podcast debuts
Actual play podcasts
Audio podcasts
Dungeons & Dragons actual play
Fantasy podcasts
Horror podcasts
Horror short stories